Muscari latifolium, the broad-leaved grape hyacinth, is a species of flowering plant in the family Asparagaceae. The Latin specific epithet latifolium means "broad-leaved".

Description 
There are usually one, rarely two leaves present. They are drawn together and often hood-shaped. The flower stem is slightly longer than the leaves. The inflorescence is a raceme 2 to 6 centimeters long and 1.5 centimeters wide. The fertile flowers at the base are 5 to 6 mm long and 3 mm wide, oblong-shaped and a deep purple colour. The sterile flowers at the top are 4–8 mm long and pale lilac or blue. The flowering period extends from April to May in the Northern Hemisphere.

Distribution  

Cultivation 
It has gained the Royal Horticultural Society's Award of Garden Merit.

References

Bibliography 
 Eckehardt J. Jäger, Friedrich Ebel, Peter Hanelt, Gerd K. Müller (eds.): Rothmaler Exkursionsflora von Deutschland. Band 5: Krautige Zier- und Nutzpflanzen. Spektrum Akademischer Verlag, Berlin Heidelberg 2008, .
 , pp. 124–130
 Pacific Bulb Society

Flora of Turkey
latifolium